Dilation theorem may refer to:

 Dilation theorem for contraction semigroups
 Sz.-Nagy's dilation theorem
 Stinespring dilation theorem
 Naimark's dilation theorem